Keio Gijuku may refer to:

Keio University, the oldest institute of higher education in Japan
Keio Gijuku (Gakkō Hōjin), the administrative body of the Keio University and its affiliated institutions